The VSFT G322 is a B diesel-hydraulic shunting locomotive, initially built for and in service with the Danish Railways DSB as Class MK.

History
In 1989, DSB ordered 30 CMI 500 locomotives from Cockerill Mechanical Industries to replace its older Class MH and MT locomotives. Originally slated for delivery in 1990, the first locomotive was only delivered in 1992. Due to high weight, technical problems and changed demands, DSB cancelled the order in 1994.

In 1995, Siemens Schienenfahrzeugtechnik was then contracted to build 20 G 322 locomotives as a replacement for the cancelled locos. A further 5 locomotives were ordered in 1997.

Operations
Initially in use by freight division DSB goods, they were transferred in 2001 to Railion Denmark. The 3 oldest locos were sold back to Vossloh in 2003. Another namechange saw the remaining 21 locomotives transferred to DB Schenker Rail Danmark Services in February 2009. DSB still have one unit in service (625) in Copenhagen, used to shunt coaches in the yard called “Belvedere” and transport coaches to the workshop at Otto Busses Vej in Copenhagen. 

A prototype locomotive, numbered 352 001-2 was built in 1996 and used for tests and leasing. It was sold to leasing company northrail in August 2008.

See also
Vossloh G 400 B, same type built after Vossloh's takeover.

References

G322B
Railway locomotives introduced in 1996
B locomotives
Diesel locomotives of Denmark
Standard gauge locomotives of Denmark
Standard gauge locomotives of Germany
Shunting locomotives